Calytrix parvivallis is a species of plant in the myrtle family Myrtaceae that is endemic to Western Australia.

It usually blooms in October producing purple flowers.

Found a small area in the Wheatbelt region of Western Australia near Dowerin  where it grows on sand or loam soils.
 
The species was first formally described by the botanist Lyndley Craven in 1987 in the article A taxonomic revision of Calytrix Labill. (Myrtaceae) in the journal Brunonia.

References

Plants described in 1987
parvivallis
Flora of Western Australia